Scottish actor James McAvoy made his acting debut as a teen in the 1995 film The Near Room with Andy Serkis. He appeared in the films Wimbledon (2004) and Inside I'm Dancing (2004), before being cast as Mr. Tumnus in the 2005 fantasy film The Chronicles of Narnia: The Lion, the Witch and the Wardrobe, based on C. S. Lewis's 1950 novel The Lion, the Witch and the Wardrobe. The following year, he starred in Kevin Macdonald's drama film The Last King of Scotland. He co-starred in the romance films Penelope with Christina Ricci (2006), Becoming Jane with Anne Hathaway (2007), and Atonement with Keira Knightley (2007). In 2008, he starred in the action thriller film Wanted opposite Angelina Jolie.

In 2011, McAvoy was cast as Charles Xavier, a fictional character based on the Marvel Comics character of the same name. He has played the role in the superhero films X-Men: First Class (2011), X-Men: Days of Future Past (2014), X-Men: Apocalypse (2016), Deadpool 2 (2018), and Dark Phoenix (2019). McAvoy starred in the 2013 crime comedy-drama film Filth, for which he won Best Actor in the British Independent Film Awards. A year later, he starred with Jessica Chastain in the drama film The Disappearance of Eleanor Rigby, the collective title of three films split into three parts, Him, Her and Them. In 2016, he portrayed Kevin Wendell Crumb, a man with 23 alternate personalities, in M. Night Shyamalan's Split, for which he received critical acclaim, and later reprised the role for the sequel Glass (2019). He has starred in the science fiction horror film Victor Frankenstein with Daniel Radcliffe (2015), action thriller film Atomic Blonde with Charlize Theron (2017), and played Bill Denbrough in the supernatural horror film It Chapter Two, the second installment of the It film series based on Stephen King's 1986 novel of the same name.

McAvoy's television work includes a minor role in the HBO war drama miniseries Band of Brothers (2001), the thriller State of Play (2003) and the science fiction miniseries Frank Herbert's Children of Dune (2003). From 2004 to 2005, he played Steve McBride in the British comedy drama Shameless. Since 2019, he has portrayed Lord Asriel Belacqua in the BBC/HBO fantasy series His Dark Materials.

He has performed in several West End productions and has received four nominations for the Laurence Olivier Award for Best Actor.

Film

Television

Stage

Video games

Audiobooks and radio

References

External links
 

Male actor filmographies
Scottish filmographies